The 1967 FIVB Women's World Championship was the fifth edition of the tournament, organised by the world's governing body, the FIVB. It was held from 25 to 29 January 1967 at the Nippon Budokan in Tokyo, Japan.

Background
Since its inaugural edition in 1952, the women's and men's World Championships were hosted by the same country. The FIVB decided to split the tournaments, awarding men's and women's to different countries, for 1966 the men's was held in Czechoslovakia and the women's was planned to be held in Lima, Peru between 12 and 29 October. Lima withdrew as organizer and the tournament was delayed until a new host could be found. With Japan chosen as host (the first time the World Championships were played in Asia), the tournament went ahead in January 1967. Due to international political tensions caused by the Cold War, hosts Japan warned it would not display the flags nor have the national anthems of North Korea and East Germany played. Both teams together with the Eastern Bloc countries (Czechoslovakia, Hungary, Poland, Soviet Union) and China forfeited the tournament, leaving only four teams as participants.

Teams

Squads

Source:

Venue

Source:

Format
The tournament was played in a single round-robin format, all four participant teams in a single pool and played each other once.

Results

|}

|}

Final standing

References

External links
 Results - todor66
 Results
 Federation Internationale de Volleyball

FIVB Women's World Championship
International volleyball competitions hosted by Japan
1967
FIVB Volleyball Women's World Championship
Sports competitions in Tokyo
FIVB Volleyball Women's World Championship
FIVB Volleyball Women's World Championship
Women's volleyball in Japan
International sports boycotts
Politics and sports
Japan–North Korea relations